Drinking Made Easy is a pub-crawl television series that premiered in 2010 and airs on AXS TV in the United States. Comedian Zane Lamprey hosts a humorous bus trip around the United States and Canada, exploring the local drinking culture of various cities in the countries. In each episode, Lamprey samples popular or original cocktails and beers from bars and breweries in the area.

Season two premiered with an hour long episode on October 5, 2011, on HDNet.

Format
Each episode begins with an overview of the highlights of the episode. Throughout the show Zane and his friend Steve McKenna visit popular bars, breweries, and distilleries where they sample different offerings from the establishments. At bars, Zane is typically behind the bar interviewing the bartender, as well as making cocktails with the help of the bartender. At some point during the episode, McKenna (and sometimes Lamprey) will engage in an eating challenge where he attempts to eat a large portion of a signature dish from a restaurant in the area. Sometimes McKenna is trying to set a record at the restaurant, othertimes he and Zane are racing to finish first or eat the most.

Another segment found only in season one is an interview led by Marc Ryan. He typically visits a brewery or distillery on his own, and tries to learn the history and story of the business, as well as sample what they produce.

Zane and Steve hold a competition in each episode called the "Six Six-Pack Challenge" where Lamprey and McKenna face off in some sort of game and bet each other six six-packs on the outcome. The games are usually inspired by the location of the episode or the bars they visit.

Cast

Zane Lamprey: Host.
Steve McKenna: Sidekick to Zane Lamprey. He typically accompanies him to all of the bars and breweries, tries the drinks Zane mixes, and participates in the food challenge(season 1 only) and six six-pack challenge.
Marc Ryan: Correspondent who does his own interviews. Only in season one.
Wes DuBois: Wears the Pleepleus costume in each episode.

Drinking game rules
The show also doubles as a drinking game, introduced after the first commercial break in each episode. The rules are as follows:

The first person to see Pleepleus in a shot can make someone else drink.
The first person to notice a continuity error can make someone else drink.
Whenever Zane and Steve compete during the show, pick a side. If you lose, you drink.
When Zane burps, the last person to make the "Good Burp" sign (putting your thumb to your forehead) has to drink.
When Marc touches someone the first person to say "touché" can make someone else drink.

Eating Challenges (Only in Season 1)

In each episode Zane challenges Steve to an eating contest. This usually involves Steve trying to finish a restaurant's specialty or Zane racing Steve to eat the most of a certain food. The eating challenges were discontinued after the first season. Zane said the reason for this was because he had always won them, which made it unfair for Steve.

Six Six-Pack Challenges

In each episode Zane and Steve challenge each other to a contest. The winner gets six six-packs. Marc always chooses a side before the game begins.

Season 1

Season 2 
In season two, the challenge was changed to simply the "Six Pack Challenge".

Season Three

The first episode of Season 3 aired on October 3, 2012 at 8pm eastern time.  The episodes were:

 Episode 1 - Houston
 Episode 2 - San Antonio
 Episode 3 - Baton Rouge
 Episode 4 - Louisville
 Episode 5 - Indianapolis
 Episode 6 - Anchorage
 Episode 7 - Juneau
 Episode 8 - Quebec City
 Episode 9 - Montreal
 Episode 10 - Burlington
 Episode 11 - Providence
 Episode 12 - Montauk
 Episode 13 - Angel City

Future

According to the official website of the show, "Due to the re-branding of AXS TV and despite the overwhelming support of the fans, Drinking Made Easy will not be continuing with a 4th season on AXS TV.  While there is still a chance that the show could be picked up by other networks, Zane and the rest of the crew decided to use this opportunity to return to an international format through the new show Chug. Most of the crew of Drinking Made Easy will continue on with the new project and even crew from Three Sheets, like Executive Producer, Mike Kelly, will be joining the team. "

Awards and recognition

References

External links
 
 

2010 American television series debuts
2012 American television series endings
2010s American reality television series
Drinking culture